Denice Zamboanga (born 14 January 1997) is a Filipino female mixed martial artist. She is ranked #3 in the ONE Championship Women's Atomweight rankings.

Background 
Zamboanga was born and raised in Quezon City, Philippines, and her older brother Drex, taught her and her three sisters the art of self-defense. When she was 17 years old, started training in taekwondo. She would later be called, won her pro debut in January 2017 via knockout in 44 seconds.

Mixed martial arts career 
Denice Zamboanga holds a professional MMA record of 8 wins and 1 loss.

ONE Championship
Zamboanga joined ONE Championship in 2019 as an undefeated MMA fighter. She managed to maintain her perfect record by defeated her first three opponents in the Singapore based martial arts organization from 2019 to 2020.

On December 6, 2019, Zamboanga made her ONE debut at ONE Championship: Mark Of Greatness, where she defeated Jihin Radzuan by unanimous decision.

On February 28, 2020, Zamboanga defeated the heavy favorite Mei Yamaguchi by unanimous decision at ONE Championship: Fire & Fury. On August 28, 2020, she defeated Watsapinya Kaewkhong by submission at ONE Championship: A New Breed.

Zamboanga is one of the eight fighters selected to compete in the inaugural ONE Women's Atomweight Grand Prix. She faced Seo Hee Ham in the Grand Prix quarter-finals at ONE Championship: Empower on September 3, 2021. She lost the bout via controversial split decision.

Zamboanga was scheduled to rematch Seo Hee Ham at ONE: X on December 5, 2021. Their rematch was later postponed for ONE Championship: X on March 6, 2022. She lost the fight by unanimous decision.

Zamboanga faced Lin Heqin on December 3, 2022, at ONE on Prime Video 5. She won the fight via split decision and during her post-fight interview she called out her friend and former teammate Stamp Fairtex.

Zamboanga is scheduled to face Julie Mezabarba on April 22, 2023, at ONE Fight Night 9.

Mixed martial arts record 

|-
|Win
|align=center|9–2
|Lin Heqin
|Decision (split)
|ONE on Prime Video 5
|
|align=center|3
|align=center|5:00
|Pasay, Philippines
|
|-
|Loss
|align=center|8–2
|  Seo Hee Ham
| Decision (unanimous)
| ONE: X
| 
| align=center| 3
| align=center| 5:00
| Kallang, Singapore
| 
|-
|Loss
|align=center|8–1
| Seo Hee Ham
| Decision (split)
| ONE Championship: Empower
| 
| align=center|3
| align=center|5:00
| Kallang, Singapore
| 
|-
|Win
|align=center|8–0
|Watsapinya Kaewkhong
|Submission (keylock)
|ONE Championship: A New Breed
|
|align=center|1		
|align=center|3:33
|Bangkok, Thailand
|
|-
|Win
|align=center|7–0
|Mei Yamaguchi
|Decision (unanimous)
|ONE Championship: King of the Jungle 
|
|align=center|3
|align=center|5:00
|Singapore
|
|-
|Win
|align=center|6–0
|Jihin Radzuan
|Decision (unanimous)
|ONE Championship: Mark of Greatness 
|
|align=center|3
|align=center|5:00
|Kuala Lumpur, Malaysia
|
|-
|Win
|align=center|5–0
|Eun Bi Cho
|TKO
|URCC Colossal
|
|align=center|2
|align=center|N/A
|Manila, Philippines
|
|-
|Win
|align=center|4–0
|Hye Sun Kim
|Submission (armbar)
|URCC Bets 5
|
|align=center|2
|align=center|N/A
|Manila, Philippines
|
|-
|Win
|align=center|3–0
|Seo Woo Yang
|Submission (rear-naked choke)
|Gleamon FC 2
|
|align=center|1
|align=center|3:09
|Seoul, South Korea
|
|-
|Win
|align=center|2–0
|Coline Biron
|Decision (unanimous)
|SAFC 33
|
|align=center|3
|align=center|5:00
|Manila, Philippines
|
|-
|Win
|align=center|1–0
|Paj Nut
|TKO (punches)
|SAFC 26
|
|align=center|1
|align=center|0:44
|Manila, Philippines
|

See also 
 List of current ONE fighters
 List of female mixed martial artists
2019 in ONE Championship
2020 in ONE Championship
2021 in ONE Championship
ONE Championship

References

External links 

 Denice Zamboanga at ONE
 
 

1997 births
Living people
Filipino female mixed martial artists
Filipino female karateka
Filipino practitioners of Brazilian jiu-jitsu
Atomweight mixed martial artists
Mixed martial artists utilizing karate
Mixed martial artists utilizing Brazilian jiu-jitsu
People from Quezon City